Qaleh Meydan (also Romanized as Qal‘eh Meydān, Qal‘eh-i-Maidān, Qal‘eh-ye Meydān, Qallah-i-Maidān) is a village in Rob-e Shamat Rural District, Sheshtomad District, Sabzevar County, Razavi Khorasan Province, Iran. At the 2006 census, its population was 391, in 103 families.

References 

Populated places in Sabzevar County